Terunobu (written:  or ) is a masculine Japanese given name. Notable people with the name include:

, Japanese architect and architectural historian
, Japanese banker and chief executive

Japanese masculine given names